The women's team sprint was held on 24 February 2013.

Results

Semifinals 

Semifinal 1

Semifinal 2

Final
The final was held at 12:00.

References

FIS Nordic World Ski Championships 2013
2013 in Italian women's sport